Giacinto Santambrogio (25 April 1945, in Seregno – 13 June 2012) was an Italian professional road bicycle racer.

Major results

1969
Coppa Bernocchi
1971
Giro d'Italia:
Winner stage 20A
1972
Tre Valli Varesine
1974
Gran Premio Città di Camaiore
Grand Prix of Aargau Canton
Larciano
1975
Tour de France:
Winner stage 20
1977
Cantu
Tour de France:
Winner stage 8

References

External links 

Official Tour de France results for Giacinto Santambrogio

1945 births
2012 deaths
People from Seregno
Italian male cyclists
Italian Tour de France stage winners
Italian Giro d'Italia stage winners
Cyclists from the Province of Monza e Brianza